Westervelt College is a Southwestern Ontario private career college located in Brantford, Kitchener, London, and Windsor. The college offers the most career training programs across Ontario. Founded in 1885 (Canada's oldest career college), it offers Diploma programs in fields  of Business, Healthcare, Law, Service, and Information Technology. The college provides career services for students and provides a job posting service for potential employers.

History 

James Washington Westervelt Sr. founded Westervelt College in 1885 in downtown London, at the corner of Richmond Street and King Street West. In 1896, Westervelt assisted in founding the Business Educator's Association of Canada. Over the years, the vocational College expanded, moved and changed ownership several times before Donna and Allan Doerr purchased the College in 1991. In 1995, the college built a new, 4-storey, 40,000 square foot campus in London, Ontario, at the corner of Bradley Ave. and Wellington Rd. which served the college until September 2017, and became a Fanshawe College campus in 2019.
In 1999, Ontario Restaurant Hotel and Motel Association awarded Westervelt "Supplier of the Year" for supplying the best graduates for employment in the Hospitality Industry. In 2009, Westervelt College received the London Chamber of Commerce Outstanding Business Achievement Award.

By 2010, the college had over 48,000 graduates, and was acknowledged by the Prime Minister of Canada, Stephen Harper, and the Premier of Ontario, Dalton McGuinty, for the 125th anniversary of its founding.

In 2017, Westervelt College was acquired and merged with three of Medix College's locations in Brantford, London and Kitchener.

In 2022, Westervelt College partnered with Ontario-based Anderson College.

External links 
 Westervelt College (official site)
 Anderson College (Official site)

See also
 Private Education in Canada
 Education in Ontario

References

Education in London, Ontario
Educational institutions established in 1885
1885 establishments in Ontario
Private colleges in Ontario